The Roman Catholic Diocese of Margarita is a diocese located on the island of Isla Margarita in the Ecclesiastical province of Cumaná in Venezuela.

History
On 18 July 1969 Pope Paul VI established the Diocese of Margarita from the Diocese of Cumaná.

Special churches
Cathedral:
Catedral Nuestra Señora de La Asunción
Minor Basilicas:
Basílica Menor Nuestra Señora de El Valle, El Valle del Espíritu Santo

Ordinaries
Francisco de Guruceaga Iturriza † (18 Jun 1969 – 2 Oct 1973) Appointed, Bishop of La Guaira
Tulio Manuel Chirivella Varela (5 Apr 1974 – 18 Oct 1982) Appointed, Archbishop of Barquisimeto
César Ramón Ortega Herrera † (25 Aug 1983 – 15 Jul 1998) Appointed, Bishop of Barcelona
Rafael Ramón Conde Alfonzo † (18 Mar 1999 – 12 Feb 2008) Appointed, Bishop of Maracay
Jorge Anibal Quintero Chacón (19 Dec 2008 – 11 Jul 2014) Appointed, Bishop of Barcelona
Francisco José Castro Aguayo (4 Aug 2015 – present)

See also
Roman Catholicism in Venezuela

Sources

Roman Catholic dioceses in Venezuela
Roman Catholic Ecclesiastical Province of Cumaná
Christian organizations established in 1969
Roman Catholic dioceses and prelatures established in the 20th century
1969 establishments in Venezuela